Sir George Parry (16001660) was an English lawyer and politician who sat in the House of Commons of England from 1640 until 1644.

Parry was probably the son of Henry Parry, Bishop of Worcester and matriculated at Merton College, Oxford on 14 March 1617 aged 16. He was admitted at the Inner Temple in 1616  and was awarded BA at Oxford in 1619. He became a Fellow at Cambridge in 1619 and was awarded LLd from Magdalene College, Cambridge in 1628. He was admitted  advocate on 3 November 1628 and became Recorder of Exeter.

In April 1640, Parry was elected Member of Parliament for St Mawes for the Short Parliament and was returned in November for the Long Parliament. Parry supported King Charles I and was knighted on 12 May 1644. He was disabled from Parliament in the same year.

Parry later lived in the City of London and died around 1670, as administration was then granted to his son Suetonius.

References

1600 births
1660 deaths
Alumni of Merton College, Oxford
Alumni of Magdalene College, Cambridge
Members of the Inner Temple
17th-century English lawyers
Members of the pre-1707 English Parliament for constituencies in Cornwall
English MPs 1640 (April)
English MPs 1640–1648